Katrina Diane Radke Gerry (born December 17, 1970) is a former competitive swimmer who represented the United States at the 1988 Summer Olympics in Seoul, South Korea.

Early life and career
Radke was born December 17, 1970. She was raised in Morris, Minnesota. At the age of 13, she and her family moved to Emmaus, Pennsylvania. By the time she was 14, she landed a spot on the U.S. National Swim Team and was its youngest member.

Radke won gold medals at the Pan Pacific Swimming Championships in 1985 and 1987 as part of the 800-meter (4 × 200 m) Freestyle Relay Team. In 1988, as a member of the U.S. Olympic Swim Team, she finished fifth in the final of the women's 200-meter butterfly event at the Seoul Olympics, recording a time of 2:11.55. During this time, she was also a member of the swim team at her high school, Germantown Academy (GA), in Fort Washington, Pennsylvania.

College years
Upon graduating from Germantown Academy in 1989, she enrolled at the University of California, Berkeley, where she broke school records while swimming for their varsity team. During her time in college, she also continued swimming for Team USA, winning two more gold medals along the way, while becoming a national champion swimmer in the 200-meter butterfly at the 1990 U.S. Long-Course Championships, where she competed alongside such swimmers as Janet Evans and Summer Sanders. Radke also was a co-captain on Team USA. She graduated Berkeley with a Bachelor's degree in International Business and Ethics, and then earned a Master's degree in Marriage and Family Therapy at Southern Connecticut State University.

Health issues
While still in high school, Radke contracted mononucleosis. Despite this, she continued to compete in swim meets even at the highest level. In 1991, she learned that she had chronic fatigue syndrome, which forced her to sit out the 1992 Olympic trials. Soon, her condition got so bad, that she found herself bedridden and had to use handicapped parking spaces when driving. In 1993, she retired from competitive swimming due to her ongoing bout with CFIDS. After 12 years of battling the disease, she finally felt well enough to attempt a comeback in Olympic swimming. She participated in the 2004 Olympic trials, thus enabling her to re-enter the world rankings after more than a decade of retirement.

In 2012, Radke authored and released a book on her life story and struggles with CFIDS, entitled Be Your Best Without the Stress.

Survivor
On August 30, 2017, it was announced that Radke was one of 18 competitors on Survivor: Heroes v. Healers v. Hustlers, the 35th season of the US version of Survivor. She was part of the Levu (Heroes) tribe and was the first person voted out of the game.

Personal life
Radke is married to former Stanford University and Olympic swim coach Ross Gerry. They reside in Excelsior, Minnesota and have two children.

Later career
Radke works as a marriage and family therapist (MFT), and an online professor for Foothill College in Los Altos Hills, California. She and her husband run a motivational coaching and health business in the Twin Cities, called WeCoach4U. In addition, she is a contributing writer to Swim Swam magazine; and in 2016, she was elected president of the newly-formed Minnesota chapter of the United States Olympians and Paralympians Association.

Bibliography
Be Your Best Without the Stress; Motivational Press, Inc. (2012),

See also
 List of University of California, Berkeley alumni

References

External links
 
 WeCoach4U

1970 births
American female butterfly swimmers
American female freestyle swimmers
American motivational writers
Women motivational writers
California Golden Bears women's swimmers
Germantown Academy alumni
Living people
Olympic swimmers of the United States
People from Morris, Minnesota
Southern Connecticut State University alumni
Survivor (American TV series) contestants
Swimmers at the 1988 Summer Olympics
University of California, Berkeley alumni
Sportspeople from Lehigh County, Pennsylvania